Adenosine thiamine diphosphate (AThDP), or thiaminylated adenosine diphosphate (ADP) is a naturally occurring thiamine adenine nucleotide. It was chemically synthesized and exists in small amounts in vertebrate liver. Its biological significance remains unknown.

See also
Adenosine thiamine triphosphate

References

Nucleotides
Thiamine
Purines
Thiazoles
Pyrimidines